The  is a system of bridges connecting the islands of Honshu and Shikoku across the Inland Sea of Japan, which were previously only connected by ferry. It consists of three major connections. The system consists of three expressways and their respective bridge systems.

Kobe-Awaji-Naruto Expressway

The eastern expressway was completed in 1998. Crossing the Akashi Strait, this connection links Hyōgo Prefecture on Honshu with Tokushima Prefecture on Shikoku, using Awaji Island for most of its length. The route connects to the Sanyō Expressway at its northern terminus, allowing traffic to connect to Himeji, Kobe, and other major cities on Honshū.

This connection uses three suspension bridges. The Akashi Kaikyō Bridge was the world's longest suspension bridge, and connects Kobe to Awaji Island (Awaji, Hyogo). The others are the Ōnaruto Bridge, connecting Awaji to Ōge Island (Naruto, Tokushima) across the Naruto Strait, and the Muya Bridge connecting Ōge Island with Shikoku.

Although the connection was initially designed to accommodate railway service as well as road traffic, economic considerations turned it into a road connection only.

Seto-Chūō Expressway

The central expressway was completed in 1988. Also known as the Great Seto Bridge, this line connects Okayama Prefecture to Kagawa Prefecture. A series of six major bridges and five viaducts are used. The six bridges are the Shimotsui-Seto Bridge, Hitsuishijima Bridge, the Iwakurojima Bridge, the Yoshima Bridge, the Kita Bisan-Seto Bridge, and the Minami Bisan-Seto Bridge.

The Seto-Chūō bridges are also used by JR trains (Seto-Ōhashi Line), and are designed to accommodate high-speed Shinkansen service in the future, although there are no current plans to extend the Shinkansen to Shikoku.

Nishiseto Expressway

The western expressway was completed in 1999. Commonly known as the Shimanami Kaidō, this connection links Hiroshima Prefecture to Ehime Prefecture. The link consists of nine bridges: the Shin-Onomichi Bridge, Innoshima Bridge, Ikuchi Bridge, Tatara Bridge, Ōmishima Bridge, Hakata-Ōshima Bridge, and the three-part Kurushima-Kaikyō Bridge. It is the only route that can be crossed on bicycle or by foot.

See also
 Five Bridges of Amakusa

References

External links
 Honshu-Shikoku Bridge Authority website

Bridges in Japan